Vladimir Malkov may refer to:
 Vladimir Malkov (badminton) (born 1986), Russian badminton player
 Vladimir Malkov (footballer) (born 1980), Russian football player